Mount J. J. Thomson is a prominent hump-shaped peak along the north wall of Taylor Valley, standing above Lake Bonney, between Rhone Glacier and Matterhorn Glacier, in Victoria Land, Antarctica. It was so named by the Western Journey Party, led by Thomas Griffith Taylor, of the British Antarctic Expedition, 1910–13. The initials have been retained to distinguish the name from Mount Allan Thomson (also named by the 1910–13 British expedition) near Mackay Glacier, Victoria Land.

References

Mountains of Victoria Land
McMurdo Dry Valleys